Ivana Brajković (Serbian Cyrillic: Ивана Брајковић; born January 11, 1993) is a Serbian women's basketball player.

Honours
Radivoj Korać 
 National Championship of Serbia (2): 2013–14, 2014–15
 National Cup of Serbia (1): 2013-14
 Adriatic League Women (1): 2013-14

External links
Profile at eurobasket.com

1993 births
Living people
Basketball players from Belgrade
Serbian women's basketball players
Centers (basketball)
ŽKK Radivoj Korać players